Olga Senyuk (born 23 January 1991) is a Moldovan–born Ukrainian recurve archer who competed for Azerbaijan at the 2016 Summer Olympics.

She competed in the individual recurve event at the 2015 World Archery Championships in Copenhagen, Denmark, and represented Azerbaijan at the 2016 Summer Olympics in Rio de Janeiro.

References

External links
 

Living people
1991 births
Sportspeople from Chișinău
Sportspeople from Lviv
Ukrainian female archers
Moldovan female archers
Azerbaijani female archers
Moldovan emigrants to Ukraine
Naturalized citizens of Ukraine
Moldovan emigrants to Azerbaijan
Ukrainian emigrants to Azerbaijan
Naturalized citizens of Azerbaijan
Olympic archers of Azerbaijan
Archers at the 2016 Summer Olympics
Archers at the 2015 European Games
European Games competitors for Azerbaijan